The Worshipful Company of Vintners is one of the oldest Livery Companies of the City of London, England, thought to date back to the 12th century. It is one of the "Great Twelve" livery companies of London, and its motto is Vinum Exhilarat Animum, Latin for "Wine Cheers the Spirit". One of the more peculiar rights of the Company involves the ceremony of swan upping.

History and origins 
It probably existed as early as the twelfth century, and it received a royal charter in 1364. Due to the royal charter, the company gained a monopoly over wine imports from Gascony. Also, it acquired the right to sell wine without a licence, and it became the most powerful company in the wine trade. However, in 1553, it lost its right to sell wine anywhere in the country.

Up to 2006, Vintners retained the right to sell wine without a licence in certain areas, such as the City of London or along the route of the old Great North Road. This right has now been abolished, but limited privileges remain.

The Vintners' Company ranks eleventh in the order of precedence of livery companies, making it one of the "Great Twelve Livery Companies".

Vintners' Hall is situated by Southwark Bridge, in Vintry ward. The nearby Garlickhythe was a dock where French garlic and wine were landed, from medieval times.

Swan upping 
One of the more peculiar rights of the company involves the ceremony of swan upping.

Procession of the Worshipful Company of Vintners  
The Worshipful Company of Vintners elects its new master each year in July, and this is celebrated with a special service at the Church of St James Garlickhythe, which is just across the road from their hall. The procession starts at Vintners Hall with the master and wardens in Tudor dress carrying nosegays. Their path is swept by a wine porter using a birch broom.

In popular culture
 The music video of Liberty X's 2002 smash hit "Just a Little" was filmed in the Vintners' Hall building. It features the group as a gang of professional burglars (with two of its members, Jessica Taylor and Kelli Young, wearing tight black latex catsuits) who steal a diamond from the building's atrium.

See also
William Abell

References

External links

 http://www.vintnershall.co.uk/

Great Twelve City Livery Companies
12th-century establishments in England